El Protector (2013) was an annual professional wrestling major event produced by Mexican professional wrestling promotion International Wrestling Revolution Group (IWRG), which took place on January 17, 2013, in Arena Naucalpan, Naucalpan, State of Mexico, Mexico. The 2013 El Protector was the second annual event produced under that name and held in January each year. The focal point of the show was the El Protector tag team tournament where seven teams competed for the trophy.

Production

Background
Lucha Libre has a tradition for a tournament where a rookie, or novato, would be teamed up with an experienced veteran wrestler for a tag team tournament in the hopes of giving the Novato a chance to show case their talent and move up the ranks. Consejo Mundial de Lucha Libre has held a Torneo Gran Alternativa ("Great Alternative Tournament") almost every year since 1994, but the concept predates the creation of the Gran Alternativa. The Mexican professional wrestling company International Wrestling Revolution Group (IWRG; at times referred to as Grupo Internacional Revolución in Mexico) started their own annual rookie/veteran tournament in 2010. The first two tournaments were called Torneo Relampago de Proyeccion a Nuevas Promesas de la Lucha Libre (Spanish for "Projecting a new promise lightning tournament") but would be renamed the El Protector tournament in 2012. The El Protector shows, as well as the majority of the IWRG shows in general, are held in "Arena Naucalpan", owned by the promoters of IWRG and their main arena. The 2013 El Protector show was the fourth time that IWRG promoted a show around the rookie/veteran tournament, with the name changing to El Protector in 2012 and onwards.

Storylines
The event featured nine professional wrestling matches with different wrestlers involved in pre-existing scripted feuds, plots and storylines. Wrestlers were portrayed as either heels (referred to as rudos in Mexico, those that portray the "bad guys") or faces (técnicos in Mexico, the "good guy" characters) as they followed a series of tension-building events, which culminated in a wrestling match or series of matches.

Tournament participants
Canis Lupus  and Pirata Morgan 
Carta Brava, Jr.  and X-Fly 
Centvrión  and Veneno 
Eita  and Negro Navarro 
Hijo del Pantera  and Pantera 
Kiwby  and Fuerza Guerrera 
Saruman  and El Solar 

Of all the teams only Hijo del Pantera and Pantera have teamed up in the past as the father/son team worked together in many matches before this show. Previous tournaments included eight teams, but for unknown reasons the 2013 tournament only had seven teams. IWRG solved the number problem by holding a "seeding" Battle Royal to determine the tournament brackets, including having the winner of the battle royal advance straight to the semi-main event. The Battle Royal included the seven "rookies" representing their teams.

Results

References

External links 
IWRG official website

2013 in professional wrestling
2013 in Mexico
2013
January 2013 events in Mexico